Black Donald Creek is a stream in Greater Madawaska, Renfrew County in Eastern Ontario, Canada. It is in the Saint Lawrence River drainage basin and is a left tributary of the Madawaska River at Black Donald Lake.

Course
Black Donald Creek begins at the confluence of an unnamed creek with Tooeys Creek just east of Ontario Highway 41. It flows south as the road diverges to the west, takes in the right tributary Doorley Creek, and continues south. The creek takes in the left tributary Malotte Creek, passes along the eastern boundary of Centennial Lake Provincial Nature Reserve, flows under Renfrew County Road 65, and reaches its mouth at the north shore of Black Donald Lake on the Madawaska River. The Madawaska River flows via the Ottawa River to the Saint Lawrence River.

Tributaries
Malotte Creek (left)
Doorley Creek (right)
Tooeys Creek (source confluence)

References

Rivers of Renfrew County